Yevgeni Vyacheslavovich Kobozev (born 11 January 1990) is a Russian former professional footballer.

Career
He made his Russian Football National League debut for FC Ufa on 9 July 2012 in a game against PFC Spartak Nalchik.

On 24 June 2018, FC Pyunik announced the signing of Kobozev. On 6 December 2019, Kobozev was one of five players released by mutual consent from FC Pyunik.

On 29 January 2020, Ararat Yerevan announced the signing of Kobozev.

During the summer of 2021, Kobozev signed for Luki-Energiya Velikiye Luki.

References

External links
 

1990 births
Sportspeople from Ryazan
Living people
Russian footballers
FC Ufa players
FC Tosno players
Vaasan Palloseura players
Jönköpings Södra IF players
FC Pyunik players
Russian expatriate footballers
Expatriate footballers in Finland
Expatriate footballers in Sweden
Expatriate footballers in Armenia
Allsvenskan players
Association football goalkeepers
PFC Krylia Sovetov Samara players
FC Torpedo Moscow players
FC Akhmat Grozny players